Genaro Jacobo Contreras is a retired Mexican professional wrestler, or Luchador in Spanish, and is a professional wrestling trainer for Consejo Mundial de Lucha Libre (CMLL). Contreras is best known under the ring name Ringo Mendoza, which he has used since his debut in 1968. Contreras has three brothers who were also professional wrestlers, Pedro Jacobo Contreras who worked as Cachorro Mendoza ("Cub Mendoza"), a  brother who wrestled as Indio Mendoza and a third brother known under the ring name "Freddy Mendoza". Mendoza wrestled his last match in 2011, transitioning to being a full-time trainer instead.

Over the course of his career Ringo Mendoza held several Middleweight championships, including the NWA World Middleweight Championship five times, Mexican National Middleweight Championship twice, the CMLL World Middleweight Championship, the  Occidente Middleweight Championship and the UWA World Junior Light Heavyweight Championship. He also held the Mexican National Tag Team Championship with his brother Chachorro, and the Mexican National Trios Championship with Kiss and Rayo de Jalisco Jr. He also won the Salvador Lutteroth Tag Tournament in 1999 with Super Astro.

Professional wrestling career
Genaro Contreras made his professional wrestling debut in 1968, after training under renowned Mexican wrestling trainer Diablo Velazco, under the  ring name "Ringo Mendoza", adopting a Native American persona complete with feathered headdress. Contreras would later be joined by his brothers who wrestled as Cachorro Mendoza and Indio Mendoza. Mendoza won his first wrestling championship on November 29, 1974, when he defeated Aníbal to win the Mexican National Middleweight Championship. Mendoza went on to hold the title for 822 days, over two years, before losing the title to Perro Aguayo on February 28, 1977. During the 822-day reign Ringo Mendoza defended the title against opponents such as Tony Salazar and Perro Aguayo. On July 3, 1977, Mendoza got a measure of revenge for his title loss as he defeated Perro Aguayo to win the NWA World Middleweight Championship, capturing the top title in this middleweight division. Mendoza would become synonymous with the NWA Middleweight Title as he captured it five times between 1977 and 1981 defeating such wrestlers as El Faraón, Perro Aguayo, Tony Salazar, and Sangre Chicana. On June 6, 1980, Mendoza defeated Satánico to win his second Mexican National Middleweight Championship, holding it for 182 days before dropping it to El Faraón. In the 1980s Mendoza began teaming more regularly with his brother Cachorro Mendoza, defeating Satánico and Espectro, Jr. in a tournament final to win the vacant Mexican National Tag Team Championship.

On January 15, 1983, Mendoza became a double champion as he defeated El Faraón to win the NWA World Light Heavyweight Championship. On July 28, 1983, Mendoza lost the championship to Satánico, but quickly regained it. The Mendozas held the tag team title for a full 1,029 days before losing to Sangre Chicana and Cien Caras on April 12, 1985. A month later Mendoza lost the NWA World Light Heavyweight title to MS-1 on February 13, 1985. On November 28, 1986, Mendoza teamed up with Rayo de Jalisco, Jr. and Kiss to defeat Los Brazos (El Brazo, Brazo de Oro, and Brazo de Plata) to win the Mexican National Trios Championship. The team held the title for 275 days before being defeated by Hombre Bala, Jerry Estrada, and Pirata Morgan on August 30, 1987. In the late 1980s Ringo Mendoza began working for the Universal Wrestling Association (UWA) where he defeated Gran Cochisse to win the UWA World Junior Light Heavyweight Championship on April 29, 1989. Over a year later, on June 29, 1990, he lost the UWA title to long-time rival Perro Aguayo. From the early 1990s on Ringo Mendoza began focusing part of his time on training wrestlers, mainly working with young wrestlers on Consejo Mundial de Lucha Libre (CMLL)'s roster. Mendoza's last wrestling related highlight came on March 7, 1999 when he defeated Emilio Charles, Jr. to win the CMLL World Middleweight Championship, making him one of a very few wrestler to have won the Mexican, NWA World and CMLL World Middleweight championships to date. Mendoza defended the championship on at least 10 occasions over the 742 days his reign lasted, defeating wrestlers such as Blue Panther, Scorpio, Jr., Rey Bucanero, Zumbido, Apolo Dantés, Black Warrior, Villano III and Mano Negra before losing the title back to Emilio Charles on March 18, 2001. Since losing the title Mendoza has focused on training wrestlers at CMLL's Mexico City and Guadalajara, Jalisco based wrestling schools. In 2011 Mendoza wrestled his last match.

Championships and accomplishments
Empresa Mexicana de Lucha Libre / Consejo Mundial de Lucha Libre
CMLL World Middleweight Championship (1 time)
Mexican National Middleweight Championship (1 time)
Mexican National Tag Team Championship (1 time) – with Cachorro Mendoza
Mexican National Trios Championship (1 time) – with Kiss and Rayo de Jalisco, Jr.
NWA World Light Heavyweight Championship (2 times)
NWA World Middleweight Championship (5 times)
Salvador Lutteroth Tag Tournament – with Super Astro
Universal Wrestling Association
UWA World Junior Light Heavyweight Championship (1 time)

Luchas de Apuestas record

Notes

References

1949 births
Living people
Mexican male professional wrestlers
Professional wrestling trainers
Professional wrestlers from Jalisco
Mexican National Middleweight Champions
Mexican National Tag Team Champions
20th-century professional wrestlers
21st-century professional wrestlers
Mexican National Trios Champions
CMLL World Middleweight Champions
NWA World Light Heavyweight Champions
NWA World Middleweight Champions
UWA World Junior Light Heavyweight Champions